Spassky Uyezd (Спасский уезд) was one of the subdivisions of the Ryazan Governorate of the Russian Empire. It was situated in the eastern part of the governorate. Its administrative centre was Spassk (Spassk-Ryazansky).

Demographics
At the time of the Russian Empire Census of 1897, Spassky Uyezd had a population of 156,976. Of these, 99.9% spoke Russian as their native language.

References

 
Uezds of Ryazan Governorate
Ryazan Governorate